Sergey Viktorovich Kolokolov (11 April 1962 – 25 September 2008) was a Soviet flatwater canoer who competed in the early 1980s. He won five medals at the ICF Canoe Sprint World Championships with two golds (K-4 500 m: 1982, K-4 10000 m: 1981), two silvers (K-4 500 m: 1983, K-4 1000 m: 1981), and a bronze (K-4 1000 m: 1983). He later studied engineering at Kherson State University. He died at Kherson on 25 September 2008.

References

Kherson State University

Soviet male canoeists
1962 births
2008 deaths
Sportspeople from Kherson
ICF Canoe Sprint World Championships medalists in kayak
Honoured Masters of Sport of the USSR